Dalloz is a surname. Notable people with the surname include:

 Adeline Dalloz (1824–1910), French ballerina
 Désiré Dalloz (1795–1869), French jurist, politician and publisher
 Marie-Christine Dalloz (born 1958), French politician

See also 

 Dallow (surname)

Surnames of French origin